Jennifer Heil (born April 11, 1983) is a Canadian freestyle skier from Spruce Grove, Alberta. Heil started skiing at age two. Jennifer Heil won the first gold medal for Canada in the 2006 Winter Olympics games in Turin, Italy and a silver medal at the 2010 Winter Olympics in Vancouver, which was also Canada's first medal in those games. Heil is the reigning world champion in dual moguls.  She has three world championship titles in total and two silver medals from the Worlds as well. Over her career, Heil has won a record-tying five overall FIS World Cup Crystal Globe titles for freestyle skiing.

Heil is involved with several charitable organisations including Because I am a Girl and Right to Play. During the 2010 Winter Olympics, Heil donated $25,000 to Because I am a Girl. Heil also speaks to students across Canada along a theme of Dare to Dream, and hosts an annual "girls only" mogul skiing camp. B2ten, created with the help of Heil, is a privately run business model organisation with the intent of raising funds to support amateur Canadian athletes.

Career

Early career
Heil competed in her first Olympics at the 2002 Winter Olympics at the age of 18, finishing fourth in the moguls, just one-hundredth of a point out of a bronze medal. She took the 2002–03 season off due to injury, and then won the World Cup in 2003–04, 2004–05 and 2005–06. Heil then won the first gold medal for Canada in the 2006 Winter Olympics in Turin, Italy. Giving Canada its first victory on the first full day of competition, Heil placed her title in the moguls event. Following the Olympics, Heil completed the season by winning her fourth straight World Cup title.

B2ten
Jennifer Heil took part in extensive experimental training in order to prepare for the Olympic Games. She worked with one of Canada's leading sports psychologists, a strength trainer, and an athletic therapist daily. After winning in 2006, Jennifer expressed her desire to build a program that would offer the same kind of support she got to other athletes in Canada. JD Miller and her coach Dominick Gauthier helped her build B2ten who now raised about 3 million dollars and supports 20 athletes from 13 different sports. Heil took the 2008 season off in order to help heal her injured knees. Following that year, Heil had a very successful 2008–09 world cup season. This included a silver medal during the stop at Cypress Mountain which was the site of the moguls competition for the 2010 Winter Olympics.

2010 Vancouver Olympics
Going into the 2010 Olympics, Heil won the last 4 2009–10 Freestyle Skiing World Cup events that she entered. She opted out of the last event before the games to give her fellow countrymen an opportunity to qualify for the games. The women's moguls qualifications began in unfavourable weather conditions with rain, sleet, and slushy conditions on the course. Heil finished the qualification in second place, meaning she ran second-to-last in the final. In the final Heil had a successful and fast run which put her in first place with one skier yet to go. Heil sat, watched, and waited as Hannah Kearney of the US had her final run. Kearney finished first and displaced Heil for both the gold and as Olympic champion. 

Heil was visibly distraught as many including herself expected her to win the gold medal. Heil had gone into the event as the reigning Olympic champion and favourite not only to win the gold, but Canada's first gold medal during a Canadian hosted Olympics ever. Heil's B2ten company was founded in part to win the first gold at home and assist fellow Canadians in their quest for medals. The honour of winning the first home-soil Olympic gold medal would go to Alexandre Bilodeau the next day on Sunday, February 14. Although Heil herself did not win it, Bilodeau's victory deserves some credit from Heil as he is a sponsored B2ten athlete as well. The next day Heil was seen on television celebrating her silver medal. She went on to say that she did not lose the gold but won the silver medal and was celebrating on stage at the medal ceremony.

According to CTV an average of about 6.6 million and a peak of 8 million Canadians tuned into their television to watch Heil try and break the gold medal slump. More Canadians watched Heil try to win gold than the 6 million that had watched the New Orleans Saints win Super Bowl XLIV.

Following her 2010 Olympics silver medal win at the Cypress Mountain venue near Vancouver, Heil went on to say that this would likely be her last games. Heil said that she wants to win a third world championship next year in 2011, following that she would like to get on with her post-mogul career. Heil said she hoped to finish her degree in management studies at McGill University after retiring following the 2010–11 season and planned to continue her work in jewellery design. She also stated that she plans to continue her work in philanthropy. Following the 2010 Olympics Heil again made a donation of $25,000, this time to Because I am a Girl, an organization that helps lift girls out of poverty. Heil said of her donation that "I’ve had the power in my hands to help and many young girls don’t have that same power. We want to make this Canada’s most giving Games ever." Alexandre Bilodeau also made a donation but he made his to the Canadian Association of Pediatric Health Centres for cerebral palsy. They both went on to encourage others to give saying that they have the ability to give back and if others were to help in their own way it would make a difference.

Finishing her career
During January of the 2010–11 World Cup season, Heil officially announced her retirement prior to the Canadian stop at the Canada Olympic Park in Calgary. Heil would say of her retirement that "I'm definitely in good shape. I could go for one more Olympic Games. I'm still at the top of my game, but for me I feel it's an important time to build on my future. I want to be as successful off the slopes as I have been on the slopes and I feel that time is now. I feel that in my heart."

Heil's next event was at the 2011 FIS World Championships. In her last event there in the moguls final, Heil won her first ever gold medal and first ever medal having previously won only in the dual moguls event. Heil said of her win there that "It's a title I've never won before and there's been a lot of discussion about that in Canada. I've never been one to count my medals and count my titles, but I'm pretty happy that that conversation is over." For the last day of the World Championships, Heil competed in the dual moguls event. There she advanced to the final where she defeated young teammate Chloé Dufour-Lapointe to win her second gold medal of the competition. The victory was her third successive dual moguls crown, more importantly it ensured that Heil would end her career as a double world champion. As a result of her dual championship golds she was awarded the Canadian Press's female athlete of the year for 2011.

Personal life
Heil is a management and political science student at Desautels Faculty of Management of McGill University in Montreal, Quebec, Canada. Heil is involved in several charities including Right to Play, a sports-based humanitarian agency, and Plan Canada’s Because I am a Girl, a program that promotes girls' rights internationally. She has stated that she wishes to continue her efforts in these charities following her retirement. In her spare time, Heil is an avid surfer.

Heil's boyfriend, Dominick Gauthier, is also her coach. They started dating in 2004 when Gauthier was coaching the Japanese moguls team. Gauthier is also the coach of men's mogul skier, Alexandre Bilodeau.

References

External links

TSN article
CTV Olympic profile

1983 births
Living people
Canadian female freestyle skiers
Freestyle skiers at the 2002 Winter Olympics
Freestyle skiers at the 2006 Winter Olympics
Freestyle skiers at the 2010 Winter Olympics
Medalists at the 2006 Winter Olympics
Medalists at the 2010 Winter Olympics
Olympic freestyle skiers of Canada
Olympic gold medalists for Canada
Olympic medalists in freestyle skiing
Olympic silver medalists for Canada
People from Spruce Grove
Sportspeople from Alberta
McGill University Faculty of Management alumni